Dunstall Hill is an inner-city area of Wolverhampton, West Midlands, England.  It is located on the north of the city centre within the St Peter's ward.

Dunstall Park
Wolverhampton Racecourse, called Dunstall Park has been based at Dunstall since 1888, having moved from its previous location at Broad Meadows, the site of the current West Park after Sir Alexander Staveley Hill sold Dunstall Hall and its estate. The first meeting took place on 13 August that year.

In 2004, an all-weather polytrack surface was laid at the racecourse.

Railway
Dunstall Park railway station opened in 1896, serving trains on the Great Western Railway. It closed in 1968 when services between Wolverhampton and Shrewsbury switched to Wolverhampton High Level station.

Aviation
In June 1910, just 4 years after the first flight in Europe, Dunstall hosted the first all-British flying meeting at Dunstall Park.

References

Areas of Wolverhampton